Banisia myrsusalis, the sapodilla borer or sapota midrib folder, is a species of moth of the family Thyrididae. It was described by Francis Walker in 1859 and is found in North America, Brazil, Australia, southern Asia (India, Sri Lanka) and Africa (Madagascar, South Africa).

Description
The wingspan is about 2 cm. Palpi with the third joint of moderate length. Antennae nearly simple in both sexes. Outer margin of both wings nearly evenly curved. Body greyish brown, where some specimens with a slight red or pink tinge. Wings are somewhat lineally striated with dark brown. Forewings with the costa yellow. Cilia fuscous on forewing and white on hindwing. Ventral side is silvery grey where striae are prominent and chestnut brown in colour. Forewings with two brownish postmedial and one sub-apical patch.

Ecology
A host plant of this species is sapodilla (Manilkara zapota), a Sapotaceae. Total life cycle of a male and a female is experimentally proved about 40.8 ± 3.97 and 45.35 ± 4.08 days, respectively.

Subspecies
Banisia myrsusalis cinereola Felder, Felder & Rogenhofer, 1875
Banisia myrsusalis elaralis (Walker, 1859)
Banisia myrsusalis sumatrensis Whalley, 1976

Host plants
Manilkara zapota
Mimusops elengi
Pouteria caimito
Madhuca latifolia
Terminalia tomentosa

References

External links
Seasonal incidence of sapota midrib folder (Banisia myrsusalis elearalis Walker) on different varieties of sapota
Sapodilla borer moth photos
Biology of leaf-folder (Banisia myrsusalis elearalis)
New distributional and foodplant records

Thyrididae
Lepidoptera of Mozambique
Lepidoptera of South Africa
Moths of Japan
Moths of Madagascar
Moths of Sub-Saharan Africa
Moths described in 1859